Morgan Cottage is a historic cure cottage located at Saranac Lake in the town of St. Armand, Essex and Franklin County, New York.  It was built between 1915 and 1916 and is a -story, wood-frame structure on a concrete foundation.  The houses as cobblestone walls to the base of the first story windows and clapboards above.  It takes a bungalow form with a broad gable roof, overhanging eaves, stone walls, and inset verandah at the front.  It features an octagonal cure porch, 12 feet in diameter.

It was listed on the National Register of Historic Places in 1992.

References

Houses on the National Register of Historic Places in New York (state)
Houses completed in 1916
Houses in Essex County, New York
Bungalow architecture in New York (state)
American Craftsman architecture in New York (state)
National Register of Historic Places in Essex County, New York